The 1906 State of the Union Address was written by Theodore Roosevelt, the 26th president of the United States, on Monday, December 3, 1906.  He did not speak directly to the 59th United States Congress.  He said, "The readiness and efficiency of both the Army and Navy in dealing with the recent sudden crisis in Cuba illustrate afresh their value to the Nation. This readiness and efficiency would have been very much less had it not been for the existence of the General Staff in the Army and the General Board in the Navy; both are essential to the proper development and use of our military forces afloat and ashore."

References

Works by Theodore Roosevelt
Presidency of Theodore Roosevelt
State of the Union addresses
59th United States Congress
State of the Union Address
State of the Union Address
State of the Union Address
State of the Union Address
State of the Union Address
State of the Union